John van Salee de Grasse (1825–1868) (his birthdate is also given as 6 June 1826) was the first African American to be formally educated as a doctor in the United States, studying first at the Oneida Institute and then getting his degree from Bowdoin College's medical school. He set up his practice in Boston, Massachusetts, where he was the first African American to become a member of the Massachusetts Medical Society (or any medical society in the US). Born in New York City, he was of multiracial ancestry: his father was born in Calcutta of Indian-French parentage and educated by his father in France, and his mother's family was African American with more distant Dutch, German and Moroccan ancestors.

Grasse supported abolitionism and efforts to resist the Fugitive Slave Act of 1850. During the American Civil War, he served in the Union Army as a surgeon with the 54th Massachusetts Regiment, the first unit formed of the United States Colored Troops.

Early life and education
John van Salee de Grasse (sometimes written as DeGrasse) was born in 1826 in New York City. He had a sister, Serena, and older brother Isaac. Their mother was Maria Van Salee of New York, a free woman of color (her surname was sometimes recorded as Van Surly). They were descendants through their mother's family of Jan Janszoon of Haarlem, Netherlands, and Margarita, a Moorish woman. That couple had four sons, who were mixed-race: two, Abraham Janszoon van Salee, and his brother Anthony, the better known, emigrated independently to New Netherlands from Amsterdam in the 1630s, settling in what became New York. Each had married European women. Their later generations of descendants, who continued to "marry white", are said to include "the Vanderbilts, the Whitneys, Jacqueline Kennedy Onassis and Humphrey Bogart." Abraham was said to have also had a son in New York by a black mistress, establishing a line that became predominately identified as African American, while also having considerable European ancestry.

Maria van Salee had married George de Grasse, who was born in Calcutta as Azar Le Guen; he was of mixed-race, Indian-French ancestry. It is likely that he was the natural son of François Joseph Paul de Grasse, a French naval officer, who was stationed on and off in India from 1762 to 1781. Based on census records, Azar was born about 1780 to an Indian woman. The senior de Grasse is known to have taken Azar as a child with him to Paris for his education and adopted him, naming him George de Grasse. The senior Grasse was long married to a French woman and had a total of five children from his marriage who survived to adulthood. His eldest son, known as Alexandre Auguste de Grasse, his title as Comte de Grasse after the father's death.

Francois de Grasse, also known as Comte de Grasse, became an admiral in 1781. He was a naval hero during the American Revolutionary War, where he commanded the French fleet in the Battle of the Chesapeake, defeating the British and contributing to their surrender at Yorktown. He also fought in the Caribbean. After the war, he returned to France, where he died in 1788.

George de Grasse immigrated as a young man to the United States, settling in New York City by 1799. His older French half-siblings had emigrated from France to Saint-Domingue to escape the French Revolution and then, during the Haitian Revolution, to Charleston, South Carolina, as refugees.
	
Through his father's connections, Grasse worked for a period for Aaron Burr, who gave him two lots in the Five Points area of Lower Manhattan, making him a landowner as a free man of color. De Grasse became a naturalized citizen of the United States in 1804. With his French-South Asian ancestry, he escaped some of the restrictions against African Americans. He and his wife Maria stressed education for their children, and all three became educated. Theodosia DeGrasse studied at the Canterbury Female Boarding School.

John de Grasse received a fine education, studying at the Oneida Institute in upstate New York from the age of 15. Then he went to Paris, where he studied medicine at Aubuk College. He returned to the United States, continuing his studies at the Bowdoin College's Medical School of Maine in Brunswick, where he earned a medical degree with honors in May 1849. He was the first person of color to earn a medical degree at a United States college. He returned to France to study under the noted French surgeon Alfred-Armand-Louis-Marie Velpeau, who published several books on obstetrics, surgery, and various medical techniques.

Marriage and family
In 1851 Grasse returned to the United States, settling in Boston. The next year on August 5, 1852, he married Cordelia Lucretia Howard of that city. Her parents were Peter and Margaret (Gardner) Howard.

His sister Serena married George T. Downing. He became a highly successful restaurateur both in New York City and in Newport, Rhode Island, as well as an activist and abolitionist. Downing used his connections with powerful white families to support abolitionism and try to achieve social change for his people.

Career and Civil War
DeGrasse set up his practice in Boston in 1854. He joined the Massachusetts Medical Society, the first African American to join any medical society in the United States.

When the United States Colored Troops were authorized for the Union Army in 1863, Grasse served as an assistant surgeon with the 35th United States Colored Infantry Regiment. DeGrasse would serve in New Bern, North Carolina and Jacksonville, Florida. DeGrasse would be Court Martialed and Cashiered out of service in Jacksonville, Florida.

See also
James McCune Smith

References

Further reading
, 
Jill L. Newmark, Binding Wounds and Pushing Boundaries: African Americans in Civil War Medicine, U.S. National Library of Medicine. National Institutes of Health (2010).
R. B. Baker, et al., "African American Physicians and Organized Medicine, 1846-1968," Journal of the American Medical Association, v. 300, no. 3 (2008).
Robert G. Slawson, Prologue to Change: African Americans in Medicine in the Civil War Era (Frederick, MD: National Museum of Civil War Medicine Press, 2006).

External links
DeGrasse-Howard Papers, 1776-1976. The Massachusetts Historical Society Library Collection Guides.
Binding Wounds and Pushing Boundaries: African Americans in Civil War Medicine. Online exhibit at the U.S. National Library of Medicine.

1825 births
1868 deaths
African Americans in the American Civil War
African-American physicians
Union Army surgeons
American people of Dutch descent
American people of French descent
American people of Indian descent
19th-century American physicians
People from Five Points, Manhattan
Oneida Institute alumni